Harlem Hotshots is an American short film from 1940 produced by Sack Amusements. The  20 minute film is a musical. One poster for the film includes a skyline of buildings and street sign for Lenox Avenue and 125th Street. The film was reissued in 1986 as part of Jazz Classics, No. 110; Harlem Harmonies Volume 1, 1940–1945.

Performances 
The film includes Leon Gross and his Orchestra playing "The Swingeroo Stomp", "
Dear Old Southland", and "I Found a New Baby", as well as  Cora Harris singing "Heaven Help That Heart of Mine". "Dance of the Bellhops" is performed by Stringbean Jackson and the Red Lily Chorus.

Cast 
 Cora Harris and her orchestra
 Lena Horne
 Stingbean Jackson
 Leon Gross (also known as Archibald) and his orchestra
 The Red Lilly Chorus
 Teddy Wilson and his orchestra

Later influences 
A 1953 film of the same name compiles the work of rhythm & blues and jazz musicians including Lionel Hampton, Dizzy Gillespie, Ruth Brown, Big Joe Turner, and Bill Bailey. It runs 50 minutes.

Harlem Hotshots was also the name of a jazz group fronted by Freddie Webster.

See also 
 Dirty Gertie from Harlem, U.S.A.

References

Further reading

External links 
 

1940 musical films
1940 short films
1940 films
Films set in Harlem